Bucculatrix pyrenaica is a moth in the family Bucculatricidae. It was described by Jacques Nel and Thierry Varenne in 2004. It is found in French Pyrenees.

References

External links
Natural History Museum Lepidoptera generic names catalog

Bucculatricidae
Moths described in 2004
Moths of Europe